AT-rich interactive domain-containing protein 1B is a protein that in humans is encoded by the ARID1B gene. ARID1B is a component of the human SWI/SNF chromatin remodeling complex.

Clinical significance 

Germline mutations in ARID1B are associated with Coffin–Siris syndrome. Somatic mutations in ARID1B are associated with several cancer subtypes, suggesting that it is a tumor suppressor gene.

Interactions 
ARID1B has been shown to interact with SMARCA4 and SMARCA2.

References

Further reading

External links 
 
 

Transcription factors